UniCredit Bank Serbia is a bank founded in 2001, headquartered in Belgrade, Serbia. It is part of the Italian banking group UniCredit, which owns 100% stake in the bank. As of 31 December 2019, the bank has a network of 72 branch offices in Serbia.

History
UniCredit Bank Serbia was owned by Bank Austria, which in turn was majority owned by German bank HypoVereinsbank (HVB), which was, in turn, majority owned by Italian-based UniCredit banking group since November 2005.

On 2 April 2007, the bank officially changed its name to UniCredit Bank Srbija a.d. Beograd.

In 2016, UniCredit became the directly parent company of the bank.

See also
 List of banks in Serbia

References

 Unikredit: Profit veći za 55 odsto, B92, February 25, 2009

External links
 

Banks of Serbia
Companies based in Belgrade
Banks established in 2001
UniCredit subsidiaries
Serbian companies established in 2001